Hussy is a 1980 British film starring Helen Mirren, John Shea, and Paul Angelis, and directed by Matthew Chapman.

Plot
Beaty (Mirren) is a prostitute working at a London cabaret where Emory (John Shea) is a sound/lighting technician. They begin an affair encumbered by Beaty's job as a call girl. 
They eventually fall in love, but predictably he grows increasingly uncomfortable with her line of work. In addition Emory has a bit of a dark secret from his past involving the accidental death of his then-wife. To further complicate things, Beaty has shared custody of a young son.

Eventually a pair of unsavory characters from each of the lovers' pasts shows up and further endangers their love. 
Emory's gay friend Max (Murray Salem) arrives and wants to cut Emory in on an upcoming drug deal. He is simultaneously foppish, arrogant and abrasive. Beaty's abusive former lover, the father of her son and possibly her pimp is Alex (Paul Angelis), a strong-arm gorilla type fresh out of prison also arrives, needing a place to stay. Alex is clearly a brutish psychopath who threatens Beaty and Emory's future. Emory and Beaty's two past companions could not be more different, Max is sophisticated, articulate, stylish and outspoken. Alex is a working class English thug, quiet, simple and burning with violent rage.
Beaty rebuffs Alex's desire to rekindle whatever they had and this enrages him. He does however agree to be part of Max and Emory's caper (believing it to be gun smuggling).

On the day of the caper, Max, Emory and Alex end up in a car together with Max continuously taunting Alex. Alex finally has enough and shoots Max dead in the car. Emory and Alex dispose of the body and it becomes apparent that Alex is aware of Emory's intention to take Beaty and her son away. He is resigned to this and insists that Emory take some surplus cash found on Max's body. Emory drops Alex off with the smuggled drugs where Alex promises to 'take care of' (kill) the drugs' intended recipients to keep them from bothering Alex, Emory or Beaty.
When Emory and Beaty first reunite, she refuses to leave the country with him, citing a concern about her son, clearly having trouble uprooting and letting go of her past even though with the proceeds from the smuggling, they will be well set up and she will never have to work at her past profession again.

The end shows Emory, Beaty and her child racing to catch a plane, free of their past encumbrances.

Cast
 Helen Mirren - Beaty Simons 
 John Shea - Emory Cole 
 Paul Angelis - Alex Denham 
 Murray Salem - Max 
 Jenny Runacre - Vere 
 Daniel Chasin - Billy 
 Imogen Claire – Imogen 
 Patti Boulaye - Cabaret Singer 
 Marika Rivera - French Singer

Publicity
The poster for Hussy was produced by noted poster artist Sam Peffer.

References

External links
 
 Review of the film in DVD Talk

1980 films
1980 drama films
Films scored by George Fenton
Films about prostitution in the United Kingdom
Films directed by Matthew Chapman
Films set in London
British drama films
1980s English-language films
1980s British films